The Italian Job is a 1969 film directed by Peter Collinson.

The Italian Job may also refer to:

 The Italian Job (charity event), an annual European car run inspired by the 1969 film
 The Italian Job (soundtrack), a soundtrack album from the 1969 film, by Quincy Jones
 The Italian Job (2003 film), a remake of the 1969 film, directed by F. Gary Gray
 The Italian Job (2001 video game), based on the 1969 film, by Pixelogic and Rockstar Games
 The Italian Job (2003 video game), based on the 2003 film, by Climax Studios and Eidos Interactive
 "The Italian Job" (2point4 Children), a television episode